Mervyn Wall (1908–1997) was an Irish writer who was born in Dublin.  Wall attended Belvedere College and worked as a civil servant 1934–48, for Radio Éireann from 1948–57, and as Secretary of the Arts Council for 1957–75. His wife, Frances Feehan, was a theatre and music critic.

Career
Wall published novels, short stories and plays, and wrote for a short-lived literary magazine, Ireland Today.

Wall wrote two humorous fantasy novels, The Unfortunate Fursey and The Return of Fursey, about
the misadventures of a monk in Dark Ages Ireland. The Fursey novels have been highly praised in North America. E. F. Bleiler in The Guide to Supernatural Fiction described The Unfortunate Fursey as  "a landmark book in the history of fantasy".
Darrell Schweitzer described Wall as "one of the finest comic fantasists ever, but also one of the most neglected." 
 Parke Godwin described both Fursey novels as "pure gold".

Writings

Novels 
 The Unfortunate Fursey, 1946
 The Return of Fursey, 1948
 Leaves for Burning, 1952
 No Trophies Raise, 1956
 Hermitage, 1982
 The Garden of Echoes, 1982

Plays 
 Alarm among the Clerks, 1940
 The Lady in the Twilight, 1971

Other publications 
 A Flutter of Wings, 1974, short stories
 Forty Foot Gentlemen Only, 1963, history

References

 Darrell Schweitzer. "Mervyn Wall and the Comedy of Despair" in Schweitzer (ed). Discovering Classic Fantasy Fiction, Gillette BJ: Wildside Press, 1986, pp. 56–67.

External links 

 
 Mervyn Wall Collection at the Harry Ransom Center

1908 births
1997 deaths
Irish fantasy writers
Irish male dramatists and playwrights
Writers from Dublin (city)
People educated at Belvedere College
20th-century Irish novelists
20th-century male writers
20th-century Irish dramatists and playwrights
Irish male novelists